Łomna  is a village in the administrative district of Gmina Nowy Wiśnicz, within Bochnia County, Lesser Poland Voivodeship, in southern Poland.

References

Villages in Bochnia County